Michael Darren Mahaffey (January 21, 1967 – May 25, 2005) was a founding member of the power pop band Self.  Founded with his brother, Matt Mahaffey, in the early 1990s, Self-released two major-label albums and various independent and Internet-only albums.  He played lead guitar, keyboards, and bass for the band on various occasions.  Before joining Self, he played in several bands, the most successful of which was the Southern Rock band Blackfish. He played lead guitar in the band, but contributed little to the songwriting. Blackfish released one major-label album in 1992 before disbanding. The other members of Blackfish were Steve Ballard (guitar & vocals), Chris Reublin (bass guitar) and Andy Howard (drums).  His last recorded work was on Self's Ornament & Crime.

Death and legacy 
He died in his sleep on May 25, 2005. Several tribute shows in his honor were held at the Exit/In in Nashville, Tennessee, with proceeds going towards a college education fund for his children. The first show featured Spongebath alumni The Katies, Fluid Ounces, and The Features, and took place on August 19, 2005. A second show on September 10, 2005, was headlined by a reunited version of Self and also featured The Privates and SJ and the Props. A third show on December 3, 2005, featured John Cowan and various musicians close to Mahaffey. In addition, wristbands were made available for purchase and bore one of his favorite phrases, "It's all good."

Annual Mike Mahaffey Tribute Show

A group of his friends have continued the tradition started with the December 3, 2005 fundraiser. The Annual Mike Mahaffey Tribute Show is held every first Saturday after Thanksgiving in Johnson City, Tennessee, at Capone's (formerly known as Gatsby's). All proceeds from these shows go to an education fund for his children.

References

American rock musicians
1967 births
2005 deaths
20th-century American musicians